John Kørner (born in 1967) is a Danish artist based in Copenhagen.

Kørner was born in Aarhus, Denmark.  His paintings feature a mixture of figurative and abstract imagery rendered in watered-down acrylic.  Some common motifs are people, animals, boats and trees.  In addition to works on canvas, Korner also paints on ceramics.

Kørner attended the Royal Danish Academy of Fine Arts in Copenhagen between 1992 and 1998.

He was awarded an Eckersberg Medal in 2012.

Selected exhibitions
2006

Painting as Presence, Künstlerhaus Bethanien, Berlin & Taidehalli, Helsinki

2005

Statements, Art Basel

Saatchi Gallery, London

2004

Momentum 04, Moss 2004, Norway

Painting 2004, Gallery Victoria Miro, London

Superdanish, Toronto, Canada

The design of Productions, Gallery Maze, Torino, Italy

2003

Galleri Stefan Andersson, Umeå, Sweden

The Greenland Problem, Herning Artmuseum, Denmark

2002

Be On Show, Galleri Christina Wilson, Copenhagen

POST, Galleri Franz Pedersen Horsens, Denmark

2001

Theater, Arhus Artmuseum – Project-room-installation

2000

Dig Og John’s Engagement, Galleri Søren Houmann, Copenhagen

References

External links
Interview at NIFCA.org
Magnus af Petersen on John Korner, ModernaMuseet.se
Images, texts and biography from the Saatchi Gallery
Article from The First Post

1967 births
Living people
Artists from Copenhagen
Royal Danish Academy of Fine Arts alumni